Zen Master Daewon Moon Jae-hyeon (born January 23, 1936) is a Korean Zen master in South Korea. A disciple of Zen Master Jeongang, he received Dharma transmission from his teacher and thereby becoming the 78th patriarch in the Dharma Lineage of the Buddha in 1962.

Activities

Teaching activities
After a period spent in isolation in 1988 he founded Moonzen and the Moonzen Zen Centers in order to widely spread the teaching he received from his master, Zen Master Jeongang. Zen Master Daewon educates and trains his disciples at Moonzen Zen Centers around the country.

Interest in environment
Faced with the many phenomena that accompany climate change, in 2009 Zen Master Daewon established the International Union to Prevent Desertification (IUPD). He is active in participating in the resolution of climate change. For example, through IUPD, Zen Master Daewon opened the measures to prevent the desertification at the UNCCD (United Nations Convention to Combat Desertification) and made an agreement with Burkina Faso and the Republic of Niger in order to stop the desertification. At present, after a successful test, the process to change barren desert into grass land is in steady process in the two countries.

Dharma transmission

Early life and background
He is recognized as a disciple of Zen Master Jeongang, the 77th patriarch and Zen Master of the Jogye Order of Korean Buddhism. Zen Master Daewon received Dharma Transmission from Zen Master Jeongang. When Master Daewon was 12, his father died in front of his eyes, and this experience left an indelible imprint on the young man's view of the world. As soon as he was able to leave his house, in 1954 he entered into the large monastery, Hae-in-sa temple under the mentorship of his preceptor Master Pak In-gok.

Searching for the true master
Since he was motivated to understand about life and death he searched around the country for an enlightened master with whom he could practice with. After practicing for several years he finally was able to meet with the famous Zen Master Jeongang sunim. In 1962 while he was practicing at Dong-hwa-sa temple the following story has been left behind.

Part of the dharma transmission story
Prior to the summer monastic retreat, the abbot of the Dong-hwa-sa temple, Wolsan sunim had publicly announced that the Zen Master Jeongang would be overseeing the 3 month retreat so meditators from around the country gathered there to practice. One evening, during a session of sitting meditation, all of the seats in the meditation hall were empty except for those of a couple elder monks. The young Daewon thought this to be unusual and then saw a young monk furtively call him out, quietly waving at him from outside the hall. When he went to him, the young monk told Daewon sunim that a group of monks were waiting for him up on the mountain out back. Daewon sunim followed the young monk into the mountain and found a gathering of twenty monks, waiting for him in stony silence. Immediately upon seeing Daewon sunim, one of the monks named Beopseong (presently known as the Zen Master Jinje, a disciple of Zen Master Hyanggok), called out to him, "Say something about Bodhidharma's 'I don't know.' Kong-an (Koan)." Daewon sunim answered without a moment's hesitation, "Revealed." Songam sunim, who was standing nearby asked him about the Ansujeongdeung Kong-an (Koan), "How would you save yourself?" Daewon sunim spoke loudly, "An (岸)! Su (樹)! Jeong (井)! Deung (藤)!" All the gathered monks stood still with their lips pursed in silence as Daewon sunim turned around and walked away. The next day after breakfast, Myeongheo sunim, who was serving as monitor for the retreat, called a temple hearing to find out why the monks had been absent without notice the night before. During the hearing, all that had happened up on the mountain was laid out in the open and as a result, the monks who had been absent during the sitting meditation session assumed their formal robes and bowed in penance before Zen Master Jeongang, who was serving as the Josil of the temple at the time.

Birth of the 78th patriarch
The next day, Zen Master Jeongang called on Daewon sunim. He told Daewon that his first Song of Enlightenment was clear evidence of his enlightenment but that a Song of Enlightenment is customarily kept short. To this, Daewon sunim recited the second Song of Enlightenment he had composed when he saw the sun and the moon in the setting sky while passing the fields of Gimje. After Zen Master Jeongang heard the second Song of Enlightenment, he again asked Master Daewon to make up another song on the spot that would encapsulate the same stage of enlightenment. Immediately upon this request, Master Daewon produced the following song:

Over the rock the wind passes through the pine trees,
And below the mountain flies the golden oriole.
There is not a trace even of the entire universe,
But the monkey cries loudly under the moonlight.

Zen Master Jeongang listened to the first two lines with his eyes gently closed; then upon hearing the last two lines, he opened his eyes, revealing delight. However, he did not stop there and asked once more, "When the others called you out on the mountain and Beopseong asked you to speak on the 'I don't know.' Kong-an (Koan), you said, 'Revealed.' If you were Emperor Wu of Liang, how wouldyou respond to Bodhidharma's 'I don't know.'?" "If I was Emperor Wu of Liang, I'd respond by saying 'Even though there is no such thing as a saint, wouldn't it be much better to enjoy the flowering of my virtue together, just like this?' and take him by the hand." Zen Master Jeongang spoke with astonishment, "How have you reached such a stage?" "How could one say that he has reached it, that he has it, or that it is of his nature? It is only just like this." In this manner, the reverend Daewon, received Dharma Transmission from the Master Jeongang and in 1962 became the 78th patriarch in the Korean tradition of Zen.

Academic Lineage of Buddhist Doctrine (Lineage of Instruction)
At his ordination ceremony in 2009, Zen Master Daewon was received into the Academic Lineages of Buddhist Doctrine by Zen Masters: Hoegwang Saseonbul (晦光 師璿佛) and Yongseong Jinjong (龍城 震鍾).

Buddhist texts translation and publications
Zen Master Daewon has translated and published collections of kong-ans, famous sutras, analects of Buddhist patriarchs and many profound Buddhist texts. Furthermore, he has reinterpreted these works with a modern viewpoint and added his own gathas and incisive comments.

, Zen Master Daewon is translating 80 volumes of the Avatamsaka Sutra and is also preparing to publish more Buddhist texts.

Translations

The Collections of kong-an (koan)

傳燈錄 The Record of Transmission of the Lamp 1 
傳燈錄 The Record of Transmission of the Lamp 2 
傳燈錄 The Record of Transmission of the Lamp 3 
傳燈錄 The Record of Transmission of the Lamp 4 
傳燈錄 The Record of Transmission of the Lamp 5 
禪門拈頌 Songs of Zen 1 
禪門拈頌 Songs of Zen 2 
禪門拈頌 Songs of Zen 3 
禪門拈頌 Songs of Zen 4 
禪門拈頌 Songs of Zen 5 
禪門拈頌 Songs of Zen 6 
禪門拈頌 Songs of Zen 7 
禪門拈頌 Songs of Zen 8 
禪門拈頌 Songs of Zen 9 
禪門拈頌 Songs of Zen 10 
禪門拈頌 Songs of Zen 11 
禪門拈頌 Songs of Zen 12 
禪門拈頌 Songs of Zen 13 
禪門拈頌 Songs of Zen 14 
禪門拈頌 Songs of Zen 15 
禪門拈頌 Songs of Zen 16 
禪門拈頌 Songs of Zen 17 
禪門拈頌 Songs of Zen 18 
禪門拈頌 Songs of Zen 19 
禪門拈頌 Songs of Zen 20 
禪門拈頌 Songs of Zen 21 
禪門拈頌 Songs of Zen 22 
禪門拈頌 Songs of Zen 23 
禪門拈頌 Songs of Zen 24 
禪門拈頌 Songs of Zen 25 
禪門拈頌 Songs of Zen 26 
禪門拈頌 Songs of Zen 27

The Quotations of the Zen Masters
無問關 The Gateless Gate 
碧巖錄 The Blue Cliff Record 
信心銘 The Gateway to Faithful Mind by Zen Master Sengcan 
法融禪師心銘 The Gateway to Faithful Mind by Zen Master Beobyung 
證道歌 The Song of Spiritual Attainment 
禪家龜鑑 The Mirror of Seon (Zen) 
法性偈 The Song of Dharma Nature 
龐居士語錄 The Quotations of Buddhist Layman Bang 
顯宗記 Revelation of the Truth by Zen Master Shinhoe

Sutras
天符經 Celestial Sign Sutra 
金剛經 Diamond Sutra 
般若心經 Prajñā-Paramitā Sutra (The Heart Sutra) 
般若心經 The Heart Sutra (Pocket book) 
維摩經 Vimalakirtinirdesha Sutra

The Collections of Dharma Lectures
"Sweet!" – Dharma Lecture Collection of the Great Zen Master Jeongang 
騎牛牧童歌 Song of a Shepherd Boy Riding on a Cow 
初發心自警文 Beginners’ Book for Vigilance 
Sitting or Standing, Enter Nirvana (die) with Complete Freedom 
看堂論 Kan-dang-non

The Collections of Gathas
佛祖正脈 Dharma lineage of the Buddha and Patriarchs (in 3 languages)

The Guide for Buddhist Ceremonies
The Guide for Buddhist Prayer and Ceremonies (complete version in Korean)

History books 
桓檀古記 (Hwandan Gogi: A Compilation of Texts on Ancient Korean History) 1 – The Compass of Truth 
桓檀古記 (Hwandan Gogi: A Compilation of Texts on Ancient Korean History) 2 – The Compass of History 
桓檀古記 (Hwandan Gogi: A Compilation of Texts on Ancient Korean History) 3 – The Compass of History 
桓檀古記 (Hwandan Gogi: A Compilation of Texts on Ancient Korean History) 4 – The Compass of History 
桓檀古記 (Hwandan Gogi: A Compilation of Texts on Ancient Korean History) 5 – The Compass of History

Books by Zen Master Daewon

The Collections of Zen Dharma Lectures
Eternal Reality 
Never Allowed Even a Hal (Shout) of Bodhidharma

Questions and Answers on Asceticism
To You Who Ask Zen 1 
To You Who Ask Zen 2

Questions and Answers on Zen
Garden Chrysanthemums and First Mountain Snow 
話頭 Hwa-du

Collection of Poetical Works
Time is a Stick and the World is a Drum

Collection of Dharma Lectures for Ordinary People
To Be a Genuine (True) Buddhist 
33 FAQs on Buddhism 
The 108 Recitations of Repentance in 3 languages 
Experience of Reality 
Experience of Reality (International version in 5 languages)

External links
Official website Moonzen Zen Center
International Union to Prevent Desertification
Moonzen Press - Publishing company founded by Master Daewon

References

Zen Buddhist spiritual teachers
Korean philosophers
Korean scholars of Buddhism
Seon Buddhist monks
Zen Buddhism writers